Viastore Systems (styled as viastore SYSTEMS Gmbh) is an international provider of materials handling systems, intralogistics software (Warehouse Management Software) and support services. Under its brand, the company focuses on the planning, implementation and continuous optimization of warehousing systems. 
Viastore Systems sells turnkey automated intralogistics systems, warehouse management systems, material flow and process controls, shuttle systems, and automated storage and retrieval systems. On 1 July 2015, the Viastore Software GmbH was founded, an own software company that combines all activities related to the warehouse management system Viadat and the SAP logistics solutions of the company. Together Viastore Systems and Viastore Software form the umbrella brand Viastore.

History 
The family-owned company, which was originally a manufacturer of scales and cranes, has undergone a major transformation over the past 130 years from metal-cutting manufacturer to digital-tech company. Over five generations it developed from a locksmith's shop and a manufacturer of machinery and equipment to a system integrator and software house. Today, viastore is a provider of systems and software for warehouse management and integrated automated material flows in logistics and industrial production.

1889: Immanuel Hahn purchases machine shop C. Haushahn, initially engaging in the construction of scales and cranes.

1900: Haushahn starts production of electric elevators.

1929: Haushahn starts production of the first “high-speed” elevators in Germany.

1970: By acquiring Weissert & Hieber, the company makes its entry into the field of warehouse technology.

1988: Formation of Haushahn Automationssysteme as an independent systems company specializing in intralogistics.

1989: Foundation of U.S. subsidiary.

1991: Foundation of subsidiary in France.

1999: 100% takeover of Haushahn Automationssysteme GmbH & Co. KG by managing director Christoph Hahn-Woernle. The company name is changed to viastore systems.

2004: Foundation of subsidiary in the Czech Republic.

2006: Sale of the American standard WMS provider Provia Software.

2007: Foundation of subsidiary in Russia.

2008: Viastore acquires conveyor systems specialist Blesco, headquartered in Grand Rapids/Michigan, thus further expanding its position in the U.S. market.

2011: Philipp Hahn-Woernle, son of Christoph Hahn-Woernle, is appointed a member of the management board.

2012: Foundation of subsidiaries in Brazil and China.

2013: Managing Partner Christoph Hahn-Woernle retires after more than 40 years in the intralogistics business.

2015: Viastore founds an independent international software company in Germany. It includes the former areas of SAP Logistics Solutions and Viadat. In this context, the company adopts a new strategic concept with Viastore being the umbrella brand and the two companies Viastore Systems and Viastore SOFTWARE positioned to provide even more intensive customer support.

Corporate structure

Headquarters in Germany 
 Stuttgart
 Bietigheim (production storage/retrieval machines)
 Löhne

International locations 
 USA
 France
 Spain
 Brazil
 Czech Republic
 Russia
 China
 Croatia
 Turkey
 Poland
 Israel
 Ukraine
 Sweden

References

External links 
 

Logistics companies of Germany
Software companies of Germany
Manufacturing companies based in Stuttgart